Hiywot Gizaw (born 1978 or 1979) is a former Ethiopian marathon runner.

She won the women's marathon event at the 1999 All-Africa Games in 2:45:38 h.

External links 

 South African and Ethiopian marathon domination, article by Mark Ouma for the IAAF, 19 September 1999 
 Ethiopia, SA dominate Games marathons, article in Independent Online, 19 September 1999

Ethiopian female marathon runners
1970s births
Living people
Ethiopian female long-distance runners
African Games gold medalists for Ethiopia
African Games medalists in athletics (track and field)
Athletes (track and field) at the 1999 All-Africa Games
20th-century Ethiopian women